"Millionaire" is a song recorded by American singer-songwriter Chris Stapleton for his third studio album From A Room: Volume 2 (2017). It was written by Kevin Welch in 2002, and soul singer Solomon Burke included it on his 2006 country music tribute album Nashville.

The song was released as a promotional single of Volume 2 on October 20, 2017, and was released to country radio as the album's first single on April 23, 2018. The song received a nomination for Best Country Solo Performance at the 61st Annual Grammy Awards.

Composition
"Millionaire" is a mid-tempo soul-influenced heartland rock and country rock ballad driven by acoustic guitar. Lyrically, the song is about "spare love" and appreciating relationship closeness over material wealth. Stapleton sings on the chorus accompanied by his wife and collaborator, Morgane.

The song is composed in the key of B-flat major with a slow tempo. It primarily follows the chord pattern B5-F5-Eadd9-B5-Eadd9-B5.
Song was recorded and sung by Chris LeDoux on After the Storm in 2002

Critical reception
Robert Crawford of Rolling Stone said the song "gets a swinging, Heartbreakers-worthy update by Stapleton and company," and considered Morgane's harmonies as "the song's secret weapon" which "trace her husband's melodies at every twist and turn." Ari Shapiro of NPR felt Stapleton's reading of "Millionaire" "has a laidback, Petty-esque jangle and, thanks to the Stapletons' cozy harmonizing throughout, a feeling of equanimity."

Commercial performance
The song has sold 250,000 copies in the United States as of April 2018.

Live performances
On December 4, 2017, Stapleton performed "Millionaire" on Jimmy Kimmel Live!, and on December 6 on The Ellen DeGeneres Show.

Charts

Weekly charts

Year-end charts

Certifications

References

External links

2017 songs
2018 singles
Chris Stapleton songs
Mercury Nashville singles
Songs written by Kevin Welch
Song recordings produced by Dave Cobb
Heartland rock songs